Sergio Reyes may refer to:

Sergio Reyes Jr., American boxer
Sergio Reyes (runner), American long-distance runner